The 2016 Chengdu Open was a men's tennis tournament played on outdoor hard courts. It was the 1st edition of the Chengdu Open and part of the ATP World Tour 250 series of the 2016 ATP World Tour. It took place at the Sichuan International Tennis Center in Chengdu, China, from September 26 to October 2.

Singles main-draw entrants

Seeds

1 Rankings are as of September 19, 2016

Other entrants
The following players received wildcards into the singles main draw:
  Casper Ruud 
  Dominic Thiem
  Wu Di

The following player received entry using a protected ranking:
  Juan Mónaco

The following players received entry from the qualifying draw:
  Michael Berrer 
  Denis Kudla
  Hiroki Moriya 
  Radek Štěpánek

Withdrawals
Before the tournament
  Nicolás Almagro →replaced by   Lu Yen-hsun
  Jérémy Chardy →replaced by  Diego Schwartzman
  Borna Ćorić →replaced by   Jordan Thompson
  Guido Pella →replaced by   John Millman
  Jo-Wilfried Tsonga →replaced by   Konstantin Kravchuk

Doubles main-draw entrants

Seeds

1 Rankings are as of September 19, 2016

Other entrants
The following pairs received wildcards into the doubles main draw:
   He Yecong /  Sun Fajing
   Wu Di /  Bai Yan

The following pair received entry as alternates:
  Albert Ramos Viñolas /  Casper Ruud

Withdrawals
Before the tournament
  Radek Štěpánek (illness)

Champions

Singles 

  Karen Khachanov def.  Albert Ramos Viñolas, 6–7(4–7), 7–6(7–3), 6–3

Doubles 

  Raven Klaasen /  Rajeev Ram def.  Pablo Carreño Busta /  Mariusz Fyrstenberg, 7–6(7–2), 7–5

External links 
Official website 

Chengdu Open
Chengdu Open
Chengdu Open